The Women's Labour League (WLL) was a pressure organisation, founded in London in 1906, to promote the political representation of women in parliament and local bodies. The idea was first suggested by Mary Macpherson, a linguist and journalist who had connections with the Amalgamated Society of Railway Servants, and was taken up by several notable socialist women, including Margaret MacDonald, Ada Salter, Marion Phillips and Margaret Bondfield. The League's inaugural conference was held in Leicester, with representatives of branches in London, Leicester, Preston and Hull. It was affiliated to the Labour Party. Margaret MacDonald acted as the League's president, while both Margaret Bondfield and Marion Phillips served at times as its organising secretary.

Much of the League's campaigning effort was devoted to the issue of women's suffrage. When the Representation of the People Act 1918 gave a partial women's franchise, the League decided to disband as an independent organisation. It became the women's section of the Labour Party, which had reorganised under a new constitution that year.

The Labour History Archive and Study Centre at the People's History Museum in Manchester holds the records of the Women's Labour League in their collection.

Members of the Executive
The following were members of the executive of the Women's Labour League:

Bertha Ayles
Jennie Baker 
Miss Bell
Miss Bellamy
Ethel Bentham
Margaret Bondfield
Katharine Bruce Glasier
Marion Curran
Charlotte Despard
Louise Donaldson
Mary Gawthorpe
Florence Harrison Bell
Mabel Hope
F. James
Edith Kerrison
Mary Longman
Eveline Lowe
Mary Macarthur
Margaret MacDonald
Miss McKenzie
Clarice McNab
Mary Macpherson
Edith Macrosty
Mary Middleton
Mary Muir
Minnie Nodin
Marion Phillips
Edith Rigby
Ada Salter
Grace Scholefield
Lisbeth Simm
Margaret Smith
Maud Ward

Notable members
 Agnes Dollan

See also
 Christian socialism

References

Social democracy
Democratic socialism
Political advocacy groups in the United Kingdom
Women's organisations based in the United Kingdom
Organizations established in 1906
1906 establishments in England
Labour Party (UK)
Women's wings of political parties in the United Kingdom